Idemili South is a Local Government Area in Anambra State, South-East Nigeria. The headquarter is Ojoto secretariate  and the estimated number of people is 159,631. The towns that make up the local government are Akwu-Ukwu, Alor, Awka-Etiti, Ojoto, Nnokwa, Oba and Nnobi.

Schools
Here are the list of secondary schools in Idemili South Local Government Area:
 John Secondary School, Akwu-Ukwu
 John Science & Technical College, Alor
 Girls’ Secondary School, Alor
 Girls’ Secondary School, Awka-Etiti
 St. Joseph's Seminary Special Science School, Awka-Etiti
 Our Lady's Secondary School, Nnobi
 Community Secondary School, Nnobi
 Community Sec. School, Nnokwa
 Unity Secondary School, Nnokwa
 Ave Maria Sec. School, Nnokwa 
 St. Stephens Sec. School, Nnokwa 
 Girls’ Secondary School, Oba
 Merchants of Light Sec. School, Oba
 Boys’ Secondary School, Ojoto
 Girls’ Secondary School, Ojoto
Okigbo Memorial Sec. Sch, Ojoto
 Glory Royal Academy Secondary School, Awka-Etiti
 Fr. Paul's Nemorial Secondary School Awka-Etiti.

References

LOCAL GOVERNMENT AREAS IN ANAMBRA STATE dated July 21, 2007; accessed October 4, 2007

Local Government Areas in Anambra State
Local Government Areas in Igboland